The Women's +75 kilograms event at the 2018 Asian Games took place on 27 August 2018 at the Jakarta International Expo Hall A.

Schedule
All times are Western Indonesia Time (UTC+07:00)

Records

Results

References

External links
Weightlifting at the 2018 Asian Games
Official Result Book Weightlifting at awfederation.com

Women's 76 kg
2018 in women's weightlifting